The 16th Festival on Wheels was a film festival held in Ankara, Turkey from December 3 to 9, 2010; Artvin, Turkey from December 10 to 16, 2010; and Ordu, Turkey from December 17 to 19, 2010. A selection of films was screened at Kızılay Büyülü Fener theater and the Goethe Institut in Ankara, and the Ahmet Hamdi Tanpınar cultural centre in Artvin with the theme of Coup d’Etat! to commemorate the 30th anniversary year of the 1980 Turkish coup d'état.

2010 Golden Bull Awards
The Golden Bull awards were handed out for the second year running to the best films of the 16th Festival on Wheels as selected by the festival jury.

 Golden Bull: Illegal directed by Olivier Masset-Depasse
 Silver Bull: Chongqing Blues directed by Xiaoshuai Wang
 Special Mention: Hair directed by Tayfun Pirselimoğlu
 SİYAD Award: Bibliothèque Pascal directed by Szabolcs Hajdu

Programs

Golden Bull Film Competition
Nine nominees, including two Turkish features, were selected to compete for the Golden Bull during the Artvin leg of this edition of the festival.

Films in competition
Illegal directed by Olivier Masset-Depasse
Chongqing Blues directed by Xiaoshuai Wang
The Temptation of St. Tony directed by Veiko Õunpuu
Pál Adrienn directed by Ágnes Kocsis
Bibliothèque Pascal directed by Szabolcs Hajdu
October directed by Daniel & Diego Vega
Mundane History directed by Anocha Suwichakornpong
Majority directed by Seren Yüce
Hair directed by Tayfun Pirselimoğlu

Special Screenings
Two international features were selected to be shown out of competition in special pre-release screenings.

Somewhere directed by Sofia Coppola
Socialism directed by Jean-Luc Godard

Turkish Cinema 2010
Five Turkish features made in the preceding year were selected to be shown out of competition in the national showcase.

Merry-Go-Round directed by İlksen Başarır
Toll Booth directed by Tolga Karaçelik
Tales From Kars directed by Özcan Alper, Ülkü Oktay, Emre Akay, Ahu Öztürk & Zehra Derya Koç
Black and White directed by Ahmet Boyacıoğlu
Zephyr directed by Belma Baş

Lives into Line!
Six international films were selected for this special section, timed to commemorate the 30th anniversary of the 1980 Turkish coup d'état, examining the impact of military coups in Turkey, Portugal, Chile,   Argentina, Brazil and Greece.
48 directed by Susana de Sousa Dias
The Year My Parents Went on Vacation directed by Cao Hamburger
Missing directed by Costa Gavras
The Judge and the General directed by Elizabeth Farnsworth & Patricio Lanfranco
The International directed by Sırrı Süreyya Önder & Muharrem Gülmez
September 12 directed by Özlem Sulak

Refugee in the City 
Two international documentaries were selected for this special section about the consequences of urban regeneration projects for human lives as much as city   plans.

My House Stood in Sulukule directed by Astrid Heubrandtner
Paradise Hotel directed by Sophia Tzavella

A Time in the Country      
One Turkish film was seşected for this special section which offers a grateful nod   to the countryside and is supported by the publication of a  collection of essays edited by Tül Akbal and Aslı Güneş under the same title.

 Vavien directed by Yağmur & Durul Taylan

See also 
 2010 in film
 Turkish films of 2010

External links
  for the festival

References

Festival on Wheels
2010 film festivals
2010s in Ankara